Eugene Murphy (born 26 August 1965) is an Irish Fianna Fáil politician who has served as a Senator for the Agricultural Panel since April 2020. He previously served as a Teachta Dála (TD) for the Roscommon–Galway constituency from 2016 to 2020.  

He was a member of Roscommon County Council for the Boyle local electoral area from 1985 to 2016. He is a producer and presenter with local radio stations Shannonside and Northern Sound.

He was the Fianna Fáil Spokesperson on the Office of Public Works and Flood Relief. 

He lost his seat at the 2020 general election.

References

External links
Eugene Murphy's page on the Fianna Fáil website

1965 births
Living people
Members of the 32nd Dáil
Fianna Fáil TDs
Local councillors in County Roscommon
Irish radio producers
Members of the 26th Seanad
Fianna Fáil senators